Benghazi Municipal Hall or Benghazi Municipality is the former town hall of Benghazi, Libya. It is located in the center of the Italian quarter in Maydan al-Baladia (Municipality Square) and is currently disused and due to undergo renovation work.

History
Benghazi Municipality was built in 1924.

Architectural features 
The building is the creation of several architects and designers. The portico of the facade and the interiors were designed by Marcello Piacentini, while the facades were designed by the architect Ivo Lebboroni. The interior frescoes are the work of Guido Cadorin, while the chandeliers are by Umberto Bellotto. The furniture inside the town hall was designed by the company Ducrot.

See also
 Town Hall

References 

Buildings and structures in Benghazi